In number theory, a prime -tuple is a finite collection of values representing a repeatable pattern of differences between prime numbers.  For a -tuple , the positions where the -tuple matches a pattern in the prime numbers are given by the set of integers  such that all of the values  are prime. Typically the first value in the -tuple is 0 and the rest are distinct positive even numbers.

Named patterns
Several of the shortest k-tuples are known by other common names:

OEIS sequence  covers 7-tuples (prime septuplets) and contains an overview of related sequences, e.g. the three sequences corresponding to the three admissible 8-tuples (prime octuplets), and the union of all 8-tuples. The first term in these sequences corresponds to the first prime in the smallest prime constellation shown below.

Admissibility
In order for a -tuple to have infinitely many positions at which all of its values are prime, there cannot exist a prime  such that the tuple includes every different possible value modulo . For example, the numbers in a -tuple cannot take on all three values 0, 1, and 2 modulo 3; otherwise the resulting numbers would always include a multiple of 3 and therefore could not all be prime unless one of the numbers is 3 itself.

It is conjectured that every admissible -tuple matches infinitely many positions in the sequence of prime numbers. However, there is no admissible tuple for which this has been proven except the 1-tuple (0). Nevertheless, by Yitang Zhang's famous proof of 2013 it follows that there exists at least one 2-tuple which matches infinitely many positions; subsequent work showed that some 2-tuple exists with values differing by 246 or less that matches infinitely many positions.

Positions matched by inadmissible patterns
Although  is not admissible it does produce the single set of primes, .

Some inadmissible -tuples have more than one all-prime solution. This cannot happen for a -tuple that includes all values modulo 3, so to have this property a -tuple must cover all values modulo a larger prime, implying that there are at least five numbers in the tuple.

Prime constellations
The diameter of a -tuple is the difference of its largest and smallest elements. An admissible prime -tuple with the smallest possible diameter  (among all admissible -tuples) is a prime constellation. For all  this will always produce consecutive primes. (Recall that all  are integers for which the values  are prime.)

This means that, for large :

where  is the th prime number.

The first few prime constellations are:

A prime constellation is sometimes referred to as a prime -tuplet, but some authors reserve that term for instances that are not part of longer -tuplets.

The first Hardy–Littlewood conjecture predicts that the asymptotic frequency of any prime constellation can be calculated.  While the conjecture is unproven it is considered likely to be true. If that is the case, it implies that the second Hardy–Littlewood conjecture, in contrast, is false.

Prime arithmetic progressions

A prime -tuple of the form  is said to be a prime arithmetic progression.

Skewes numbers
The Skewes numbers for prime k-tuples are an extension of the definition of Skewes' number to prime k-tuples based on the first Hardy-Littlewood conjecture. Then the first prime  that violates the Hardy-Littlewood inequality for the -tuple , i.e., such that
 

The table below shows the currently known Skewes numbers for prime k-tuples:

The Skewes number (if it exists) for sexy primes  is still unknown.

References 

.
.

Prime numbers